Maskey is a surname. Notable people with the surname include:

 Alex Maskey (born 1952), Irish politician 
 Chandra Man Singh Maskey (1900–1984), Nepalese artist 
 Deeya Maskey, Nepalese movie actress
 Paul Maskey (born 1967), Irish republican politician 
 Sameer Maskey, computer scientist
 Sarina Maskey (born 1987), Nepalese beauty queen
 Shanti Maskey (1928–2011), Nepali actress 
 Shilpa Maskey (born 1992), Nepalese film actress
 Supriya Maskey (born 2000), Nepalese beauty queen
 Umesh Maskey, Nepalese boxer
Sushmita Maskey, Mountaineering record holder!!

See also